Carboxypeptidase B (protaminase, pancreatic carboxypeptidase B, tissue carboxypeptidase B, peptidyl-L-lysine [L-arginine]hydrolase) is a carboxypeptidase that preferentially acts upon basic amino acids, such as arginine and lysine.  This serum enzyme is also responsible for rapidly metabolizing the C5a protein into C5a des-Arg, with one less amino acid.

References

External links 
 The MEROPS online database for peptidases and their inhibitors: M14.003
 

EC 3.4.17
Metabolism